A bill to amend the Migratory Bird Treaty Act to exempt certain Alaskan Native articles from prohibitions against sale of items containing nonedible migratory bird parts, and for other purposes was a proposed law that would have allowed Alaskan Natives to make and sell traditional handicrafts such as masks, jewelry, clothing, and hunting equipment that are made from parts of migratory birds, particularly feathers.

H.R. 3109 was introduced and passed in the United States House of Representatives during the 113th United States Congress. It was not passed in the Senate, and expired at the conclusion of the 113th United States Congress.

Background

The statute makes it unlawful without a waiver to pursue, hunt, take, capture, kill or sell birds listed therein ("migratory birds"). The statute does not discriminate between live or dead birds and also grants full protection to any bird parts including feathers, eggs and nests. Over 800 species are currently on the list. The U.S. Fish and Wildlife Service issues permits for otherwise prohibited activities under the act. These include permits for taxidermy, falconry, propagation, scientific and educational use, and depredation, an example of the latter being the killing of geese near an airport, where they pose a danger to aircraft.

Provisions of the bill
This summary is based largely on the summary provided by the Congressional Research Service, a public domain source.

H.R. 3109 would amend the Migratory Bird Treaty Act to provide that nothing in such Act prohibits possessing, selling, bartering, purchasing, shipping, and transporting any authentic Alaskan Native article of handicraft or clothing on the basis that it contains a nonedible migratory bird part. Makes such exemption inapplicable with respect to any handicraft or clothing containing any part of a migratory bird that was taken in a wasteful manner.

H.R. 3109 would define "authentic Alaskan Native article of handicraft or clothing" to mean any item that is composed of natural materials and produced, decorated, or fashioned by an Alaskan Native (Indian, Aleut, or Eskimo who resides in Alaska), in the exercise of traditional Alaskan Native handicrafts, without the use of any pantograph or other mass copying device, including any weaving, carving, stitching, sewing, lacing, beading, drawing, or painting.

Congressional Budget Office report
This summary is based largely on the summary provided by the Congressional Budget Office, as ordered reported by the House Committee on Natural Resources on July 30, 2014. This is a public domain source.

H.R. 3109 would amend the Migratory Bird Treaty Act to allow Alaskan Natives to make and sell traditional handicrafts such as masks, jewelry, clothing, and hunting equipment that are made from parts of migratory birds, particularly feathers. The Congressional Budget Office (CBO) estimates that implementing the bill would not have a significant effect on the federal budget.

Because enacting the legislation could reduce revenues and associated direct spending from civil and criminal penalties, pay-as-you-go procedures apply. However, CBO estimates that any such effects would be negligible.

H.R. 3109 contains no intergovernmental or private-sector mandates as defined in the Unfunded Mandates Reform Act and would not affect the budgets of state, local, or tribal governments.

Procedural history
H.R. 3109 was introduced into the United States House of Representatives on September 17, 2013 by Rep. Don Young (R, AK-0). It was referred to the United States House Committee on Natural Resources and the United States House Natural Resources Subcommittee on Fisheries, Wildlife, Oceans and Insular Affairs. On September 8, 2014, the bill passed the House in a voice vote.

Debate and discussion
In testimony before Congress, a spokesperson for the United States Department of the Interior (DOI) stated that it "does not support H.R. 3109." According to the spokesperson, "in 1886, 5 million birds were estimated to be killed for their feathers." The goal of the Migratory Bird Treaty Act was to end "the commercial trade in birds and their feathers that, by the early years of the 20th century, had devastated populations of many native bird species." The Department did acknowledge, however, "the economic and cultural need in Alaska Native communities to improve their quality of life with opportunities to benefit from their unique handicrafts and other traditional items."

See also
List of bills in the 113th United States Congress

References

External links

Library of Congress - Thomas H.R. 3109
beta.congress.gov H.R. 3109
GovTrack.us H.R. 3109
OpenCongress.org H.R. 3109
WashingtonWatch.com H.R. 3109
Congressional Budget Office's report on H.R. 3109
 Migratory Bird Treaty on Cornell's U.S. Code Collection
 List of bird species covered under the Migratory Bird Treaty
 U.S. Fish and Wildlife Service's guide to U.S. laws protecting migratory birds (including the Migratory Bird Treaty)

Proposed legislation of the 113th United States Congress
Bird conservation
Alaska Natives and United States law